Agnès Thill (born 2 June 1964) is a French politician who served as a member of the National Assembly from 2017 to 2022, representing the department of Oise.

In parliament, Thill served as member of the Committee on Cultural Affairs and Education. In addition to her committee assignments, she was a member of the parliamentary friendship groups with the Democratic Republic of the Congo, Mali and the Central African Republic.

In 2019, Thill publicly opposed a bioethics law extending to homosexual and single women free access to fertility treatments such as in vitro fertilisation (IVF) under France's national health insurance; it was one of the campaign promises of President Emmanuel Macron and marked the first major social reform of his five-year term. She was subsequently excluded from La République en Marche and later joined the Union of Democrats and Independents.

She lost her seat in the first round of the 2022 French legislative election.

See also
 2017 French legislative election

References

1964 births
Living people
Deputies of the 15th National Assembly of the French Fifth Republic
La République En Marche! politicians
21st-century French women politicians
Politicians from Paris
Women members of the National Assembly (France)